Samed Ali Kaya (born 10 September 1995) is a Turkish professional footballer who plays as a forward for Kocaelispor.

Professional career
On 18 July 2018, Kaya signed with Göztepe after a season as the top scorer in the TFF Second League Kaya made his professional debut with Göztepe in a 2-1 Süper Lig loss to Büyükşehir Belediye Erzurumspor on 10 November 2018.

References

External links
Soccerway Profile
TFF Profile
Mackolik Profile

1995 births
Living people
People from Tomarza
Turkish footballers
Kayserispor footballers
Tarsus Idman Yurdu footballers
Kayseri Erciyesspor footballers
Göztepe S.K. footballers
Büyükşehir Belediye Erzurumspor footballers
Süper Lig players
TFF First League players
TFF Second League players
Association football forwards
Adana Demirspor footballers
Menemenspor footballers
Ankaraspor footballers
Adanaspor footballers
Kocaelispor footballers